Calvin is a town in Hughes County, Oklahoma, United States. The population was 294 at the 2010 census.

History
The present community of Calvin was established in 1895, when the Choctaw, Oklahoma and Gulf Railway (C O & G)  laid a line through the Choctaw Nation between McAlester (then in Indian Territory) and Oklahoma City (then in Oklahoma Territory). The community was initially called "Riverview", for its location on the south bank of the Canadian River. The Riverview post office was established on March 21, 1895, with John Wilbur as postmaster. The town (and post office) name was changed to Calvin in June, 1895, to honor the Choctaw landowner, Calvin Perry. The Choctaw Nation Town Site Commission surveyed Calvin's site and divided it into 350 lots, which were put up for sale.

About 1904, a fire destroyed several business buildings and the Masonic Lodge on Canadian Street (the main street in downtown Calvin. These losses were soon replaced with new all-brick buildings. In 1905, the population was reportedly about 300. From then until the Great Depression, Calvin served as a busy trade center for the area's produce.

In 1906 J. W. Hundley established a store and in 1907 erected a building, the largest mercantile establishment in Hughes County. A ferry operating across the Canadian River gave access to Calvin's cotton market and railroad connections. The Missouri, Oklahoma and Gulf Railroad (M, O &G)  constructed a line through the area, reaching Calvin in 1909. By that time the growing town offered the surrounding agricultural community a choice of four cotton gins, eight general stores, two hotels, and numerous other businesses typical of the era.

Geography
Calvin is located in south-central Hughes County at  (34.967315, -96.249811), on the south side of the Canadian River. U.S. Route 75 passes just east of the town limits, leading north  to Wetumka and south  to Coalgate. U.S. Route 270 comes in with US 75 from the north but turns east at Calvin and leads  to McAlester. Oklahoma State Highway 1 runs through the center of Calvin, leading east with US 270 to McAlester and west  to Ada.

Demographics

As of the census of 2000, there were 279 people, 120 households, and 75 families residing in the town. The racial makeup of the town was 82.44% White, 10.75% Native American, and 6.81% of the population.

There were 120 households, out of which 32.5% had children under the age of 18 living with them, 50.0% were married couples living together, 11.7% had a female householder with no husband present, and 36.7% were non-families. 33.3% of all households were made up of individuals, and 15.8% had someone living alone who was 65 years of age or older. The average household size was 2.33 and the average family size was 2.96.

In the town, the population was spread out, with 25.1% under the age of 18, 9.7% from 18 to 24, 29.0% from 25 to 44, 21.1% from 45 to 64, and 15.1% who were 65 years of age or older. The median age was 32 years. For every 100 females, there were 102.2 males. For every 100 females age 18 and over, there were 88.3 males.

The median income for a household in the town was $20,357, and the median income for a family was $23,409. Males had a median income of $17,083 versus $16,500 for females. The per capita income for the town was $10,651. About 21.6% of families and 27.0% of the population were below the poverty line, including 42.4% of those under the age of eighteen and 18.0% of those 65 or over.

Notes

References

External links
 Encyclopedia of Oklahoma History and Culture - Calvin

Towns in Hughes County, Oklahoma
Towns in Oklahoma
Populated places established in 1895
1895 establishments in Oklahoma Territory